Arnold Carl "Arnie" Oss, Jr. (born April 18, 1928) is an American ice hockey player. He won a silver medal at the 1952 Winter Olympics.

Early life
He was born in Minneapolis, Minnesota, the son of Arnold and Frances Oss. He attended Dartmouth College in the late 1940s. While at Dartmouth, he was a defenseman for the ice hockey team. He graduated in 1950.

Awards and honors

Olympics
He won a silver medal at the 1952 Winter Olympics.

References 

1928 births
Living people
Ice hockey people from Minneapolis
American men's ice hockey forwards
Ice hockey players at the 1952 Winter Olympics
Olympic silver medalists for the United States in ice hockey
Medalists at the 1952 Winter Olympics
Dartmouth Big Green men's ice hockey players
AHCA Division I men's ice hockey All-Americans